The 2000 Fordham Rams football team was an American football team that represented Fordham University during the 2000 NCAA Division I-AA football season. Fordham tied for last place in the Patriot League. 

In their second year under head coach Dave Clawson, the Rams compiled a 3–8 record. Ray Reddin was the team captain.

The Rams were outscored 318 to 211. Their 1–5 conference record placed them in a tie for sixth in the seven-team Patriot League standings. 

Fordham played its home games at Jack Coffey Field on the university's Rose Hill campus in The Bronx, in New York City.

Schedule

References

Fordham
Fordham Rams football seasons
Fordham Rams football